Incontrolable is an album by the Spanish ska punk band Ska-P. It was released in 2004 and recorded live in Switzerland, Italy and France. It also includes a DVD with 13 of the tracks from the album.

The cover depicts the band's fully laden tour bus being driven recklessly by Gato López, who is also "giving the claw", and smashing through a border control bar. A startled bald eagle (the national bird of the United States) has just managed to escape being hit. The title could be loosely translated either as "uncontrollable" or "out of control".

Track list CD

Track list DVD

Personnel 
 Pulpul – vocals, guitar
 Luismi – drums
 Julio – bass
 Joxemi – guitar
 Kogote – keyboard
 Pipi – backing vocals

External links 
Ska-P's official website

Ska-P albums
Live video albums
2004 live albums
2004 video albums